National Highway 334DD, commonly referred to as NH 334DD is a national highway in India. It is a secondary route of National Highway 34.  NH-334DD runs in the state of Uttar Pradesh in India.

Route 
NH334DD connects Hamidpur, Jewar, Jhajhar, Kakod, Thana Chola, Bulandshahr in the state of Uttar Pradesh.

Junctions  
 
  Terminal near Hamidpur.
 Junction with Yamuna Expressway near Jewar
  Terminal near Bulandshahar.

See also 
 List of National Highways in India
 List of National Highways in India by state

References

External links 

 NH 334DD on OpenStreetMap

National highways in India
National Highways in Uttar Pradesh